Rut Birgitta Dahl (born 20 September 1937) is a Swedish former politician of the Social Democratic Party. Dahl was a Member of Parliament from 1969 to 2002. She served as Minister for Energy from 1982 to 1990, as Minister for the Environment from 1986 to 1991, and as Speaker of the Parliament from 1994 to 2002. She was the chairman of the Swedish section of the United Nations Children's Fund (UNICEF) between 2005 and 2011.

Education and early career 
Birgitta Dahl was born in Råda, Härryda Municipality, Västra Götaland County. She earned a B.A. at Uppsala University in 1960. During her studies she was politically active in the Uppsala Student Union. 

She worked as a senior administrative officer at the Swedish International Development Cooperation Agency from 1965 to 1982, as a course assistant at the Swedish North Africa Institute from 1964 to 1965, at the Dag Hammarskjöld Foundation from 1965 to 1967.

Member of Parliament
Dahl served as a Member of Parliament from 1969 to 2002 (until 1970 as a member of the lower house).

The 1969 elections resulted in the election of many young MPs which was then uncommon, and Dahl belonged to the first representatives of the Protests of 1968 and second-wave feminism to be elected to the Parliament. In 1969, women were still in the minority and the majority of MPs were still mainly old men, and Dahl attracted some controversy with her miniskirt and the fact that she was an unwed mother. 

In 1975, Dahl motioned for the establishment of public day care and to enlarge the existing day care system to make it possible to all citizens to access it, which would make it more possible for women to combine family and work. This was a major reform within the women's movement, and was finally approved by Parliament in 1985. 

For a period of several years, Dahl worked for a reform of parental leave, so that it could be equally shared between the parents regardless of gender, instead of being reserved for mothers. This was a major reform of the parental leave system, and it was finally approved by Parliament in 1974.

Dahl was a leading figure behind the reform of child corporal punishment laws, in which parents were outlawed from beating their children in 1979.

Aside from motioning for new laws, Dahl worked to implement the 1965 law against rape within marriage. While rape within marriage had been banned in 1965, the law had not been used in practice, and no one was sentenced for the crime until 1984. Dahl worked for the already existing law to be made use of.

Khmer Rouge controversy 
This was a time period with strong sympathy for Vietnam and resistance toward American involvement in South East Asia during the Vietnam war. 

During the period of 1975 to 1979, when Cambodia was ruled by the government of Pol Pot and his Khmer Rouge party, approximately 1.7 million Cambodians were killed. Dahl created controversy when she refused to believe the reports of atrocities committed by the Khmer Rouge regime. In 1976, Dahl participated in a debate on Sveriges Radio about the situation in Cambodia, where she said, among other things, that: "It was completely necessary to evacuate Phnom Penh. It was necessary to rapidly start the production of provisions and it would require large sacrifices from the population. [...] But that's not what currently is our problem. The problem is that we really don't have knowledge, direct testimonies, in order to reject all lies that are spread by the enemies of Cambodia".  Dahl reiterated these views in an article in the journal Vietnam Nu (published by the Swedish Committee for Vietnam, Laos and Cambodia) in 1977.
After the end of the Khmer Rouge regime in 1979, the atrocities were confirmed.

Cabinet Minister
From 1980 to 1981, she served as a Swedish delegate to the United Nations.

She was Minister for Energy from 1982 to 1990, and Minister for the Environment from 1986 to 1991. She first served in the Cabinet of Olof Palme. In 1986, Palme's successor Ingvar Carlsson let her keep her position as Minister for Energy, and also gave her the post of Minister of Environment. 

When the Social Democratic Party won the 1982 Swedish general election, she was appointed Minister for Energy. 

As Minister for the Environment, she banned the use of chlorofluorocarbon, which had previously been common. 

After intense campaigns during her time in office, Dahl secured support in Parliament to shut down two nuclear power reactors. This decision was supported by a large majority in Parliament from the Social Democrats, the Communists, the Greens and the Centre Party, and had the support by Prime Minister Ingvar Carlsson, and Minister of Finance Kjell-Olof Feldt. Dahl publicly described this decision as irrevocable. However, the decision was met with opposition and after an intense lobbying campaign, the decision was retracted in 1989.

Speaker of the Parliament
After the Election of 1994, Dahl was appointed Speaker of the Parliament, a post she kept until 2002. She was the second woman in Sweden to serve as such. The Elections of 1994 resulted in the Parliament of Sweden becoming the most gender equal parliament in the world. As Speaker, Dahl introduced regulations in the Parliament to stop any form of sexual harassment. 

When Dahl was appointed Speaker of the Parliament in 1994, Per Ahlmark questioned her appropriateness to the office due to her past statements about the Khmer Rouge regime, in his book The Open Sore.  In the debate that ensued, Dahl made a public apology in Dagens Nyheter, in which she wrote: "The problem was that I – and others – at the same time yet believed that much of what had been written about Cambodia were lies and speculation. We believed – incorrectly – that it was part of the propaganda to accuse the new regime in Cambodia of even worse crimes that had previously been committed. I also had a hard time imagining that something as shocking could be true. Therefore, there are some statements by me that I deeply regret. Ever since the terrible truth became clear to me, I've been in pain that I didn't grasp and repudiate the cruelties of the Pol Pot regime quickly enough."

Personal life 
Dahl was first married to Bengt Kettner, divorced, and was secondly married to Enn Kokk from 1986 until his death. She has three children. One of her daughters, is also a former Social Democratic politician.

Awards 
Dahl was awarded the Illis quorum in 2003.

References 

|-

1937 births
Living people
People from Härryda Municipality
Uppsala University alumni
Members of the Riksdag from the Social Democrats
Members of the Andra kammaren
Speakers of the Riksdag
Swedish Ministers for the Environment
Women members of the Riksdag
Recipients of the Order of the Cross of Terra Mariana, 3rd Class
Women government ministers of Sweden
Women legislative speakers
20th-century Swedish women politicians
20th-century Swedish politicians
21st-century Swedish women politicians
Members of the Riksdag 1968–1970
Members of the Riksdag 1970–1973
Members of the Riksdag 1974–1976
Members of the Riksdag 1976–1979
Members of the Riksdag 1979–1982
Members of the Riksdag 1985–1988
Members of the Riksdag 1988–1991
Members of the Riksdag 1991–1994
Members of the Riksdag 1994–1998
Members of the Riksdag 1998–2002
20th-century Swedish women
Recipients of the Illis quorum